Griselda Steevens (also known as Grizel Steevens or Grizell Steevens) (1653 – 18 March 1746) was a philanthropist and a benefactor of Dr Steevens' Hospital in Dublin. For a time it was commonly known as "Madame Steevens' Hospital".

Life

Steevens was born in 1653 in Wiltshire, in England. She was the twin sister of Dr Richard Steevens (1653–1710), a Dublin physician. They were the children of John, a Royalist cleric, and his wife Constance. The family moved to Athlone, Co Westmeath when John was made a rector there in 1664.

Richard Steevens died in 1710,  leaving a considerable fortune which produced an income of £606 (about £ as of ) per year to Griselda. Richard directed that upon his sister's death the funds should be used in building, and subsequently maintaining, a hospital in Dublin 'for maintaining and curing from time to time such sick and wounded persons whose distempers and wounds are curable'.

Griselda Steevens decided that she would begin work on the hospital in 1717. Reserving only £120 per year for her own use, she surrendered the remainder to trustees to build the new hospital.

By 1723 a sufficient portion of the new Dr Steevens' Hospital was completed to accommodate 40 patients, in addition to Griselda's apartments. The remainder of the hospital, with space for 200 patients, opened in 1733. The new hospital was known as "Madame Steeven's Hospital".

It was the first public hospital established in Dublin, where it became one of the foremost institutions of its kind. Jonathan Swift was one of its earliest governors, and Stella (Esther Johnson) in her will bequeathed £1000 towards the maintenance of a chaplain .  Grizell Steevens died in Dublin on 18 March 1747.

By her will she bequeathed the residue of her property to the governors of the hospital. She was buried in the hospital chapel.

The archives of the hospital are in the Library of Trinity College Dublin.

See also
Pig-faced women

References and sources

Notes

Sources

1653 births
1746 deaths
English twins
Irish philanthropists
Irish folklore
18th-century Irish women
18th-century women philanthropists